Olivia Hallinan (born 20 January 1985) is a British actress best known for her role as Laura Timmins in the BBC TV series Lark Rise to Candleford and also as Kim in the Channel 4 drama Sugar Rush. She also starred as Ellie in Girls in Love.

Biography
Hallinan is from Twickenham, west London, and is the second youngest of four sisters. Olivia Hallinan began training at her mother's Saturday drama school All Expressions in Teddington when she was 11, and then went on to professional acting. After attending St Catherine's School in Twickenham, and Notting Hill & Ealing High School, in Ealing, Hallinan went on to study English and Drama at the University of Manchester. and became a teacher at Stanley Primary school in the Richmond Borough.

In 2020 Olivia Hallinan confirmed she was in a relationship with former polo player, now actor and presenter Charles Smith. They live in Windsor, Berkshire and have a child together (born May 2021).

Acting career
Hallinan has appeared in over 100 productions since the age of seven. Her first professional role was playing alongside Cilla Black in a 1991 production of Jack and the Beanstalk. Since then, she has appeared in theatre, radio, film and on television shows including The Bill, Holby City, My Family, Julia Jekyll and Harriet Hyde and Granada TV's, Girls in Love. At the end of her first year at the University of Manchester, Hallinan appeared in the first of two series of the cult TV drama Sugar Rush for Channel 4, based on the Julie Burchill novel. On 9 June 2007, Hallinan was a speaker at the Stonewall Gay Youth Conference, talking about playing a lesbian character in Sugar Rush.

While at Manchester, Hallinan was actively involved in student drama. In 2006, her final year of her degree, she starred in Nicola Schofield's new play, Wake Me Later. That same year she played Emma in the Torchwood episode Out of Time, appeared in an episode of Trial and Retribution, and played a character in Radio 4's dramatisation of Marguerite Duras's erotic novel The Lover, broadcast between 3 and 7 September 2007. She starred as Laura Timmins in the BBC production Lark Rise to Candleford which first aired on Sunday 13 January 2008, appearing in all four series. 

Hallinan was named one of the 2008 UK Stars of Tomorrow in Screen International, a prestigious industry publication that highlights the hottest up and coming actors and filmmakers. A-List actors Tom Hiddleston, Michelle Dockery, Dev Patel, Claire Foy, Carey Mulligan, Aaron Taylor-Johnson and Gugu Mbatha-Raw were among this coveted list alongside Hallinan this same year. 2011 saw her film debut as she starred in the British film noir Jack Falls as Natasha.

In 2011 Hallinan starred in Precious Little Talent written by Ella Hickson and directed by James Dacre at Trafalgar Studios theatre in London's West End. In December 2011 Hallinan played the role of Justine in Lucinda Coxon's play "Herding Cats" at the Hampstead Theatre, London, a role she previously played at the Ustinov Studio, Bath in December 2010. In 2013, she starred as Marianne Dashwood in Helen Edmundson's BBC Radio 4 adaptation of Jane Austen's Sense and Sensibility. In 2014 Hallinan appeared in Lotty's War (written by Giuliano Crispini and directed by Bruce Guthrie) at the Yvonne Arnaud Theatre, Guildford, before touring the UK.

Filmography

References

External links
 

1985 births
People from Hounslow
Living people
English television actresses
English radio actresses
Alumni of the University of Manchester
People educated at Notting Hill & Ealing High School
People educated at St Catherine's School, Twickenham